Sar Zeh-ye Sofla or Sarzeh-ye Sofla may refer to:
 Sar Zeh-ye Sofla, Hormozgan
 Sarzeh-ye Sofla, Kerman